Mustafa "Mos" Abdellaoue (born 1 August 1988) is a Norwegian professional footballer who most recently played as a forward for Eliteserien side Sarpsborg 08. He is the younger brother of former Norway international Mohammed Abdellaoue.

Club career

Abdellaoue was born in Oslo, Norway. He made his debut for Skeid in 2007, and played a total of six games during the relegation campaign from the First Division, the second tier in Norwegian football. He was loaned out to Lillestrøm and played games for their reserve team in Norwegian Second Division, scoring one goal, before returning to Skeid. In 2008, he scored 17 goals in 20 matches when Skeid won the Second Division Group 2, and gained direct promotion back to the First Division.

In September 2008, Abdellaoue and his teammate Dawda Leigh signed for Norwegian Premier League side Vålerenga IF under the Bosman rule, and joined the club on 1 January 2009. His brother Mohammed had also joined the club from the same club the season before.

On 13 April 2009, Abdellaoue scored his first league goal for Vålerenga in a 2–0 victory away to Lillestrøm.

In the 2010 season, he was named top-scorer of the Norwegian Second Division avd. 1 with Vålerenga's B team, scoring 27 goals. He scored 13 in that division the season before with the same team.

Abdellaoue spent the 2011 season loaned out to Tromsø IL, where he became the top scorer of Tippeligaen with 17 goals. He finished runner-up in the league with Tromsø. After he returned from Tromsø, Vålerenga rejected a 5 mill NOK offer for him from F.C. Copenhagen in January 2012.

Mostafa joined FC Copenhagen in January 2012. Mostafa scored his first goal in a friendly against FC Anzhi. In his third match he scored twice against his former club Vålerenga IF in his debut at Parken.

On 31 August 2013, Abdellaoue was sent on a one-year loan deal to OB.

In July 2014, Abdellaoue returned to the Tippeligaen permanently by signing for Aalesunds FK.

On 24 January 2018, Strømsgodset announced that he had signed a four-year-contract with the club.

International career
"Mos" made his debut for the senior team when he replaced Thomas Sørum at half time in a 1–1 friendly draw against Denmark on 15 January 2012.

Personal life
He is the younger brother of former Norway international Mohammed Abdellaoue.

Career statistics

Club

Honours
Skeid
Norwegian Second Division Group 2: 2008

Copenhagen
Danish Superliga: 2012–13
Danish Cup: 2011–12

Individual
Tippeligaen Top goalscorer: 2011
Norwegian Cup Top goalscorer: 2016, 2018

References

External links

F.C. Copenhagen profile

1988 births
Living people
Norwegian footballers
Norway youth international footballers
Norway international footballers
Norwegian people of Moroccan descent
Skeid Fotball players
Norwegian Second Division players
Norwegian First Division players
Vålerenga Fotball players
Tromsø IL players
Aalesunds FK players
Strømsgodset Toppfotball players
Sarpsborg 08 FF players
Eliteserien players
F.C. Copenhagen players
Odense Boldklub players
Danish Superliga players
Norwegian expatriate footballers
Expatriate men's footballers in Denmark
Norwegian expatriate sportspeople in Denmark
Footballers from Oslo
Association football forwards
Norwegian men's futsal players